This article is about the particular significance of the year 1719 to Wales and its people.

Incumbents
Lord Lieutenant of North Wales (Lord Lieutenant of Anglesey, Caernarvonshire, Denbighshire, Flintshire, Merionethshire, Montgomeryshire) – Hugh Cholmondeley, 1st Earl of Cholmondeley 
Lord Lieutenant of Glamorgan – vacant until 1729
Lord Lieutenant of Brecknockshire and Lord Lieutenant of Monmouthshire – John Morgan (of Rhiwpera)
Lord Lieutenant of Cardiganshire – John Vaughan, 1st Viscount Lisburne
Lord Lieutenant of Carmarthenshire – vacant until 1755
Lord Lieutenant of Pembrokeshire – Sir Arthur Owen, 3rd Baronet
Lord Lieutenant of Radnorshire – Thomas Coningsby, 1st Earl Coningsby

Bishop of Bangor – Benjamin Hoadly
Bishop of Llandaff – John Tyler
Bishop of St Asaph – John Wynne
Bishop of St Davids – Adam Ottley

Events
March - The 41st (Welch) Regiment of Foot is raised by Colonel Edmund Fielding as Edmund Fielding's Regiment of Foot.
date unknown
The Davies brothers of Bersham begin work on the wrought-iron gates at Chirk Castle.
The first permanent legal printing press in Wales is established at Adpar by Isaac Carter of Carmarthenshire. It is believed that its first two publications are Cân o Senn i’w hen Feistr Tobacco by Alban Thomas and Cân ar Fesur Triban ynghylch Cydwybod a’i Chynheddfau.
On the death without heirs of Sir John Wynne, the Wynnstay estate passes to Jane Thelwall, the great-granddaughter of Sir John Wynn, 1st Baronet.
The Welsh Charity School in London moves to Ailesbury Chapel, Clerkenwell, where it remains until about 1721.

Arts and literature

New books
Christmas Samuel - Catecism o'r Scrythur
Eglurhad o Gatechism Byrraf y Gymanfa
Browne Willis - Survey of Llandaff

Births
February - William Edwards, clergyman and bridge engineer (d. 1789)
22 February - Joshua Thomas, writer and Particular Baptist minister (d. 1797)
17 June - Joshua Parry, nonconformist minister and writer (d. 1776)
30 November - Princess Augusta of Saxe-Gotha, future Princess of Wales (d. 1772)
date unknown - Sir Herbert Lloyd, 1st Baronet, politician (d. 1769)

Deaths
11 January - Sir John Wynn, 5th Baronet, 90 
4 April - Thomas Powys, judge, 70/71
19 June - Captain Howell Davis, pirate, ca 29
11 October - Samuel Jones, Dissenting minister and tutor

References

1710s in Wales
Years of the 18th century in Wales